Thomas Russell "Nick" Carter (5 September 1924 – 23 November 2003) was a racing cyclist from Nelson, New Zealand, who won a silver medal in the men's road race at the 1950 British Empire Games in Auckland. He also competed in the road race at the 1948 Summer Olympics in London.

Carter was educated at Nelson College from 1937 to 1939. He died in 2003 and his ashes were buried in Marsden Valley Cemetery, Stoke.

Major results
Source:
1945
 1st  Road race, National Road Championships
1946
 1st  Road race, National Road Championships
1947
 1st  Road race, National Road Championships
1949
 1st  Road race, National Road Championships
1950
 2nd  Road race, British Empire Games

References

External links
 

1924 births
2003 deaths
New Zealand male cyclists
Olympic cyclists of New Zealand
Cyclists at the 1948 Summer Olympics
Commonwealth Games silver medallists for New Zealand
Cyclists at the 1950 British Empire Games
Sportspeople from Nelson, New Zealand
People educated at Nelson College
Burials at Marsden Valley Cemetery
Commonwealth Games medallists in cycling
20th-century New Zealand people
Medallists at the 1950 British Empire Games